Otosico Havili (born 14 September 1963) is a Tongan boxer. He competed in the men's middleweight event at the 1984 Summer Olympics. At the 1984 Summer Olympics, he lost to Arístides González of Puerto Rico.

References

External links
 

1963 births
Living people
Middleweight boxers
Tongan male boxers
Olympic boxers of Tonga
Boxers at the 1984 Summer Olympics
Place of birth missing (living people)